Hawak-Kamay (International title: Instant Dad / ) is a 2014 Philippine family drama television series starring Piolo Pascual, Iza Calzado, Nikki Gil, Xyriel Manabat, Andrea Brillantes, Zaijian Jaranilla and Yesha Camile. The series premiered on ABS-CBN's Primetime Bida evening block and worldwide on The Filipino Channel from July 21, 2014 to November 21, 2014, replacing Dyesebel and was replaced by Dream Dad.

Synopsis
Gin Agustin (Piolo Pascual) is a frustrated musician who becomes the guardian of the three orphans that his late sister adopted: Emong (Zaijan Jaranilla), Dara (Xyriel Manabat), and Ningning (Yesha Camile). Gin is unprepared to be the guardian of three young children, but with the help of the strict attorney Bianca Magpantay (Iza Calzado) and her sister (later revealed to be her daughter) Lorrie (Andrea Brillantes), Gin learns how to be a good parental figure to these three children. Different trials threaten to tear them apart, but Gin becomes determined to fight to keep all of them together and give them a complete family along with Atty. Bianca and Lorrie. Little by little they realize that it isn't important that they aren't related by blood because love makes a family.

Cast and characters

Main cast
 Piolo Pascual as Eugene "Gin" B. Agustin
 Iza Calzado as Atty. Bianca Magpantay-Agustin
 Zaijian Jaranilla as Raymond "Emong" A. Vitorio / Raymond M. Agustin 
 Xyriel Manabat as Sandara "Dara" Nicholas / Sandara M. Agustin 
 Andrea Brillantes as Lorraine "Lorrie" M. Caballero 
 Yesha Camile as Bituin "Ningning" A. Vitorio / Princess A. dela Rama

Supporting cast
 Nikki Gil as Meryl Ann "Meann" Marcelo
 Juan Karlos Labajo as Charles Kenneth "CK" Rodríguez
 Nadia Montenegro as Grace Catacutan
 Atoy Co as Santi Marcelo
 Gilleth Sandico as Chayong Marcelo
 Leo Rialp as Renato Magpantay
 Evangeline Pascual as Patrice Magpantay
 Hyubs Azarcon as Otoy
 Rubi Rubi as Baby
 Ana Abad Santos as Denise Rodriguez
 Moi Bien as Rihanna
 Jess Mendoza as Tolits
 Lloyd Zaragoza as Rambo
 Dianne Medina as Christina
 Axel Torres as Icko Mendoza
 Maris Racal as Wendy
 Manolo Pedrosa as Mikey
 Nichole Baranda as Hazel
 Jacob Dionisio as Rafael "Paeng" Marcelo
 Crispin Pineda as Edgar
 Cara Eriguel as Yanie
 Ryan Bang as Bok
 Fatima Cadiz as Yaya Fatima

Guest cast
 Buboy Garovillo as Ethan Mendoza
 Ahron Villena as Shred De Vera
 Bernard Palanca as Jacob Caballero
 Brenna Garcia as Erika
 Belle Mariano as Cherry
 Harvey Bautista as Alfonso
 Manuel Chua as Arnold
 John Regala as Leonardo Salonga
 Teresa Loyzaga as Dra. Carmen Ignacio
 Edgar Allan Guzman as Anton dela Rama
 Nadine Samonte as Grace dela Rama

Special participation
 Tirso Cruz III as Philip Agustin
 JM De Guzman as Brian Agustin
 Pinky Amador as Wilma Agustin
 Precious Lara Quigaman as Sophia Bustos-Agustin
 Jason Abalos as young Philip
 Jennifer Silva as Lily Agustin-Vitorio
 Lander Vera Perez as Borge Vitorio
 Regine Angeles as young Wilma
 Jairus Aquino as teen Gin
 Vangie Martelle as teen Lily
 CX Navarro as young Brian
 Yogo Singh as Coby
 Bea Basa as Marjorie
 Jenny Miller as Maristel
 Justin Cuyugan as Marcus
 Alyyson McBride as Chloe dela Rama

Awards and nominations

See also
List of programs broadcast by ABS-CBN
List of ABS-CBN drama series

References

ABS-CBN drama series
2014 Philippine television series debuts
2014 Philippine television series endings
Philippine children's television series
Filipino-language television shows
Television shows set in the Philippines